Sekou Macalou (born 20 April 1995) is a French rugby union flanker who currently plays for Stade Français in the Top 14 and France.

International career

International tries

References

External links
France profile at FFR
L'Équipe profile

1995 births
Living people
French rugby union players
Stade Français players
Rugby union flankers
France international rugby union players